28 (twenty-eight) is the natural number following 27 and preceding 29.

In mathematics

It is a composite number, its proper divisors being 1, 2, 4, 7, and 14.

Twenty-eight is the second perfect number - it is the sum of its proper divisors: . As a perfect number, it is related to the Mersenne prime 7, since . The next perfect number is 496, the previous being 6.

Twenty-eight is the sum of the totient function for the first nine integers.

Twenty-eight is a harmonic divisor number, a happy number, a triangular number, a hexagonal number, a Leyland number of the second kind and a centered nonagonal number.

It appears in the Padovan sequence, preceded by the terms 12, 16, 21 (it is the sum of the first two of these).

It is also a Keith number, because it recurs in a Fibonacci-like sequence started from its decimal digits: 2, 8, 10, 18, 28...

Twenty-eight is the third positive integer with a prime factorization of the form , where  is an odd prime.

Twenty-eight is the ninth and last number in early Indian magic square of order 3.

There are twenty-eight convex uniform honeycombs.

Twenty-eight is the only positive integer that has a unique Kayles nim-value.

Twenty-eight is the only known number that can be expressed as a sum of the first nonnegative (or positive) integers, a sum of the first primes and a sum of the first nonprimes, and it is unlikely that any other number has this property.

There are twenty-eight oriented diffeomorphism classes of manifolds homeomorphic to the 7-sphere.

There are 28 elements of the cuboid: 8 vertices, 12 edges, 6 faces, 2 3-dimensional elements (interior and exterior).

There are 28 different ways in which 1,000 can be expressed as the sum of two prime numbers.

In science
 The atomic mass of silicon.
 The atomic number of nickel.
 The fourth magic number in physics.
 The curing time of concrete is classically considered 28 days.
 The average human menstrual cycle is 28 days, although no link has been established with the nightlighting and the Moon.

Astronomy
 The rotation time of the surface of the Sun varies due to it being gas and plasma. At 45°, it rotates every 28 days.
 The Sun's surface gravity is 28 times that of Earth. 
 Messier 28, a magnitude 8.5 globular cluster in the constellation Sagittarius.
 The New General Catalogue object NGC 28, an elliptical galaxy in the constellation Phoenix.

In sports
 The number of players on the active roster of teams in Nippon Professional Baseball. However, each team is limited to using 25 players in a given game; before every game, the manager must designate three players who will be ineligible for that game.
 From 2020, the number of players on the active roster of Major League Baseball teams for regular-season games on or after September 1.

In other fields
Twenty-eight is:
 An abbreviation for such years as 1928 and 2028.
 The number of Hebrew letters in Genesis 1:1, the first verse of the Bible.
 The number of wheels on a Lockheed C-5 Galaxy.
 In the code for international direct dial phone calls, +28 is unassigned.
 028 is the ISO 3166-1 numeric three-digit country code for Antigua and Barbuda.
 The number of days in the shortest month of the Gregorian calendar, February  in common years. All twelve months of the Gregorian calendar have at least 28 days, regardless of the year.
 The Gregorian calendar follows a 28-year cycle for the most part, since there are seven days in a week and leap year generally occurs every four years; usually, a calendar from any year is the same as that from 28 years earlier (e.g., 1992 and 2020 or 1994 and 2022). However, that rule holds only when there have been exactly seven leap days in a 28-year interval; years divisible by 100 but not by 400 are common years. Indeed, 1900 (as well as 2100, 2200, etc.) does not use the same calendar as 1872 (2072, 2172, etc., respectively) for the simple reason that 1900 is a common year. In 28 years, any day-of-the-week and date combination occurs exactly four times. February 29 will fall on each day of the week once.
 In Jewish tradition there is a 28-year solar cycle in which the sun returns to its place in Creation every 28 solar years. This is commemorated in April every 28 years with the recitation of Birkat Hachama, the blessing of the sun. 
 The common name for the parrot Barnardius zonarius semitorquatus, widely distributed in Western Australia and South Australia. Its call sounds like "wenniate".
 The number of letters in the Danish and Swedish alphabets (not counting W), and also in the Arabic and Esperanto alphabets.
 The number of Chinese constellations, "Xiu" or "mansions" (a literal translation), equivalent to the 12 western zodiac constellations.
 The number of dominoes in standard domino sets.
 Deriving from the 29.46 year period of Saturn's revolution around the Sun, the 28-year cycle as well as its subdivisions by 14 and 7 are supposed in astrology to mark significant turning points or sections in the course of a persons development in life. Thus, the number 28 has special significance in the culture of religious sects such as the Kadiri and the Mevlevi dervishes. The 28-beat metric pattern often used in the music compositions accompanying the main part of the Mevlevi sema ritual is called the "Devri kebir", meaning the "Big Circle" and is a reference to above astronomical facts about the year and the Saturn year.
 In Quebec, François Pérusse, in one of his best-selling Album du peuple made a parody of Wheel of Fortune in which all of the letters picked by the contestant were present 28 times. As a result, 28 became an almost mythical number used by many Quebec youths, the phrase "Y'en a 28" (There are 28 [Letters]) became a running gag still used and recognized more than 15 years later.
 The Preludes, Opus 28 consists of  Frédéric Chopin's 24 preludes for piano, ordinarily but not necessarily played together in concert.
 The postal code of the province of Madrid, in Spain.
 Twenty Eight is a popular game played in Kerala, India.
 The number of the French department Eure-et-Loir.
 Approximately the number of grams in an ounce, and used as such in the illegal drug trade.
 The UIC Country Code for Georgia identifying member countries of the International Union of Railways (UIC).
 The letter Q when encoding the serial number for intermodal (shipping) containers as defined by ISO 6346.
 The name of a single on the Trilogy by The Weeknd.
 The name of the song on the album Strictly Diesel by Spineshank.
 The number of Panfilov's Guardsmen, said to have heroically fallen in combat on 16 November 1941 during the Battle of Moscow, and venerated as Soviet's national heroes.
 The number of stab wounds in a murder case in the video game Detroit: Become Human. The phrase "28 Stab Wounds" spoken by a character in the game has become an Internet meme.

See also
 List of highways numbered 28

References

External links
 Prime Curios! 28 from the Prime Pages

Integers